LKE, or Lke, may refer to

LKE, the IATA code for Kenmore Air Harbor Seaplane Base in the state of Washington, US
lke, the ISO 639-3 code for the Soga language spoken in Eastern Uganda
LKE, the National Rail code for Lake railway station on the Isle of Wight, UK

See also